Athesis is a Neotropical genus of clearwing (ithomiine) butterflies, named by Edward Doubleday in 1847. They are in the brush-footed butterfly family, Nymphalidae.

Species
Arranged alphabetically:
Athesis acrisione Hewitson, 1869
Athesis clearista Doubleday, [1847]
Athesis vitrala Kaye, 1918

References

Ithomiini
Nymphalidae of South America
Nymphalidae genera